Nephrotoma quadrifaria, also known as the four-spotted cranefly, is a species of true cranefly found in most of Europe and Great Britain. The subspecies N. q. farsidica is found in Iran.

Subspecies
N. q. farsidica (Savchenko, 1957)
N. q. quadrifaria (Meigen, 1804)

References

Tipulidae
Diptera of Europe
Insects described in 1804
Taxa named by Johann Wilhelm Meigen